The following lists events that happened during 1966 in Laos.

Incumbents
Monarch: Savang Vatthana 
Prime Minister: Souvanna Phouma

Events

August
August - The Battle of Nam Bac begins.

Births
18 June - Bounlap Khenkitisack, footballer

References

 
1960s in Laos
Years of the 20th century in Laos
Laos
Laos